Jintong may refer to:

Jintong (mythology), literally "Golden Boy", a close servant of the Jade Emperor in Chinese mythology
Jintong (881–884), a Chinese era name used by the Tang rebel Huang Chao when he declared himself the Qi emperor
Princess Joguk (1308–1325), born Jintong, a Mongolian who married King Chungsuk of Goryeo

See also
Cliff Lok (born 1948), also known as Jin Tong 金童 (Chin Tung, Kam Tung, Kan Tung etc.), Hong Kong actor